Margaret Martin may refer to:

Murder of Margaret Martin (1918–1938), in December 1938
Margaret E. Martin (1912–2012), economist and statistician
Margaret P. Martin (1915–2012), American statistician
Margaret Martin (doctor of public health) (born 1954), American doctor and author
Margaret V. Martin (bodybuilder) (born 1979), American bodybuilder
Margaret Trevena Martin (1905–?), British botanist and phycologist